Ninetails may refer to:

 Cat o' nine tails, a nine-tailed whip
 Typha latifolia, a perennial herbaceous plant commonly named "cat-o'-nine-tails"
 Ninetails, a main boss in the video game Ōkami

See also
 Ninetales, a nine-tailed fox Pokémon